The first season of the 2008 American Gladiators revival premiered on January 8, 2008, and concluded on February 17 of the same year, airing on NBC in the United States and Citytv in Canada.

Format
Season 1 of the revival featured 24 contenders (12 male, 12 female). Men and women compete in separate tournaments, with two men and two women competing in each episode. In each episode, contenders take part in several events against the Gladiators, trying to earn as many points as possible before the final event, the Eliminator. Each point separating the contenders translates into a half-second advantage for the leader (or a half-second handicap for the trailing contender). Preliminary round matches consisted of four events plus the Eliminator; semifinals and finals matches were extended to five events plus the Eliminator (by comparison, the original series had either six or seven events plus the Eliminator).

The four male contenders and the four female contenders who won their respective preliminary matches with the fastest Eliminator times advanced to the semifinals; the winners of the two semifinals matches competed in the finals.

The grand prize was $100,000, a 2008 Toyota Sequoia, and the right to become a Gladiator for Season 2.

Gladiators

Reserves

Contenders

Female contenders

Male contenders

Events

The following is a list of events featured on American Gladiators. Descriptions of events that were played on the original version of American Gladiators contain only the changes made in the revival and the season the event was introduced in is shown in brackets. Season 1 featured a total of ten events, including the Eliminator.

Assault
In Assault, the contenders begin the course holding the ball for use in the first weapon, a slingshot. The second station is a rotating turret that contenders must rotate into position and load themselves. The third station is a sandpit where an arrow is hidden for the crossbow waiting at station four (they complete the station by finding the arrow). Contenders are given a smokescreen at station three to assist in moving to station four.  The fifth station consists of throwing three balls at the target. If the contenders hit any part of the target, they earn 10 points.  Hitting the target or pushing the button at the end of the course triggers pyrotechnics at the Gladiator's platform, and the Gladiator is rapidly pulled off the platform by a pulley and harness fly system across the arena and into the water tank. If time runs out, or contenders are hit by a ball fired by the Gladiator before hitting the target, they earn one point for each station completed.

Earthquake
In Earthquake, the contender and Gladiator wrestle on a  platform that is suspended above the floor and is moved during the event. If the Contender takes the Gladiator off the platform, he or she is declared the winner, even if he or she also comes down in the process. A Contender gets 10 points if he or she pulls the Gladiator down, and 5 points if he or she lasts the entire 30 seconds. Holding on to the wires supporting the Earthquake ring is legal, but kicking or otherwise using the foot to remove the Contender from the ring is not. The event is similar in concept to "Conquer", the second part of "Breakthrough and Conquer".

Gauntlet
In Gauntlet, the contenders earn two points for each of four Gladiators they pass within the 30-second time limit and an additional two points if they can break through a foam wall 10 feet beyond the final Gladiator, for a maximum of 10 points. The rule change is similar to the seventh and eighth seasons of the UK Series. In addition, the Gauntlet is enclosed, so contenders cannot be pushed "out of bounds."

Hang Tough
In Hang Tough the course is shorter, situated over a pool of water, and has much smaller platforms. Further, the Gladiator is allowed to use the contender's equipment (such as the straps holding the backpack) to pull the contender in. As in the original version, contenders receive 5 points if they are still on the course when the 60-second time limit expires.

Hit & Run
In Hit & Run, which was first introduced in the UK version, the contender traverses a 50-foot suspension bridge hanging above the water tank. Four Gladiators, two on each side of the bridge, attempt to knock the contender off using 100-pound demolition balls. Contenders receive two points for each successful trip across the bridge within the 60-second time limit, and must press a button on the platform to register the points (a difference from the UK version, which required contenders to touch the rail at the back of the platform). Furthermore, there is no penalty for crawling on the suspension bridge, as there was in the UK version, though the referee has instructed contenders to return to their feet in some instances after significant crawling.

Joust
In Joust, the platforms are situated over a pool of water. Gladiators, but not contenders, may be disqualified if both their knees touch the platform simultaneously. Both gladiators and contenders will be disqualified if they step on their opponents' platform. If gladiator is knocked off by contender the contender will earn 10 points. If the contestant does not get hit off by 30 seconds then the contender will receive 5 points.

Powerball
In Powerball, the time limit is now 60 seconds. In addition, the playing field is lined with padded walls, which means there is no "out of bounds," and the scoring bins have much wider openings, making tossed balls more effective than the original. For Season 2, caps have been added to the scoring pods to narrow the opening and prevent the contenders from scoring by shooting the ball and the course has been enlarged.

Pyramid
In Pyramid, Modified UK Gladiators rules have been adopted.  Contenders earn 5 points for getting their feet atop the Pyramid tier marked with a white dotted line. Pressing the button at the top within the 60-second time limit is worth 5 more points, for a total of 10, and immediately ends the event.

The Wall
The Wall uses the original format, with a three-section Wall, and contestants are given a seven-second head start. The Wall was 40 feet high in Season 1 (an eight-foot increase over the Wall in the original American Gladiators). Contenders and Gladiators cross floating platforms to reach the Wall (the same platforms were used at the beginning of the Eliminator). Once the Gladiators begin their pursuit, the platforms are retracted. Contenders that are pulled or fall from the Wall drop into the water. Unlike previous editions, however, contenders earn 5 points if they are still on the Wall when the 60-second time limit expires.

The Eliminator
In Season 1, The Eliminator had these tasks:
Traverse the floating platforms used in the Wall
Climb an 8-foot wall. (a rope is provided to help climb up)
Swim under a fiery surface.
Climb a 30-foot cargo net.
Go downward on an inclined barrel roll (A rope is provided to help hold on)
Use a hand bike to cross a pit
Run down a balance beam inclined downward
Run up the pyramid
Travel down a zipline
Run up the Travelator (a rope is provided to help climb up)
Climb a short flight of stairs
Then crash through the foam wall from gauntlet

Quarterfinals

Females
Heat 1

Heat 2

Heat 3

Heat 4

Heat 5

Heat 6

Eliminator Times

Males
Heat 1

Heat 2

Heat 3

Heat 4

Heat 5

Heat 6

Eliminator Times

Semifinals

Females
Heat 1

Heat 2

Eliminator Times

Males
Heat 1

Heat 2

Eliminator Times

Finals

Females

Males

Elimination Table
Females

Males

References

Gladiators (franchise)
2008 American television seasons